The National University of Engineering (UNI) is located in Managua, Nicaragua. It is acknowledged by its meticulous and selective admission system, through a high difficulty exam with top components of math and physics. The average of approved applicants is about 6% out of a pool of more than 2,000 applicants per year. This keeps the new students compromised permanently to the "highest exigency level" of excellency.

History

On February 7, 1983, the Junta of National Reconstruction issued the Decree 1234 that founded the National University of Engineering (UNI). Previously, the engineering and architectural education in Nicaragua was located in the National Autonomous University of Nicaragua (UNAN) and the Universidad Centroamericana (UCA).

Nowadays, the UNI is one of the most prestigious universities in Nicaragua, it attends around 10,880 students, organized in six schools in three different campus, offering eleven specialties.

Background
The first signs of the discipline called engineering in Nicaragua go back to 1680, in the San Ramon Seminary located in the city of Leon, where were taught the first courses of arithmetic, geometry, algebra and physics; this seminary reached the level of university by royal decree on January 10, 1812. In 1881 was founded the School of Arts and Crafts in Managua under the direction of French engineers, for the education and guiding of railway train rail's workers, this in response to the construction of the railway tracks at that time. This work would be the most influential focus in the development of the engineering.

However, the genesis of UNI dates back to 1941, when it was created the School of Engineering under the leadership of the Engineer Julio Padilla Mendez. In August 1941, the recently created Central University of Nicaragua was joined to this effort and the result was the Faculty of Physics-Mathematics Sciences. In this Faculty were taught courses for the career of Civil Engineering, and an extension to the careers of Architecture, Mining Engineering and Electrical Engineering.

The first graduation of civil engineers was in 1946; the graduated persons were: Anibal Arana, Emilio Cuadra, Salvador Garcia, Armando Hernandez, Francisco Molina and Emilio Jarquín. That year the Central University of Nicaragua was closed due to student protests against the regime of General Anastasio Somoza Garcia. The Faculty of Physics-Mathematics Sciences continues to run despite the government's actions against university community. In 1947 the University of Leon is elevated to a National University and the Faculty of Physics-Mathematics Sciences was joined to it.

The Faculty of Physics-Mathematics Sciences until 1959 remains unchanged its curriculum and academic system. Since 1958, the year of University Autonomy, begins the analysis regarding the operation, academic performance, content of the curriculum and the insertion of new careers. In 1959, is being debated publicly about the deficiency in math presented by high school graduates who enter the career of Engineering, as well as the low graduation of 90 students graduated 3 or 5 nothing more, per year. In 1959 was publicly discussed the deficiency in math presented by high school graduates entering the engineering career as well as the low graduation. Only 3-5 graduated from an enrollment of 90 students. Starting this year was applied an examination for admission to applicants to engineering career. This examination was maintained until the year 1967 that was transformed into an examination of classification.

In 1962, the founder of Faculty Engineer Julio Padilla Mendez died leaving a worthy example of perseverance and dedication to the training of engineers. The Deanship is assumed by one of the graduates of the second promotion Engineer Carlos Santos Berroterán.

In 1964 was founded the School of Architecture, ascribed to the aforementioned Faculty, because before that professionals in the architecture made his professional education outside of Nicaragua. The Faculty of Physics-Mathematics Science expands its field with setting up the careers of Topography and Geodesy (1967) and short courses of Master Works and Industrial Supervisors (1972) and finally establishing the career of Agricultural Engineering.

It is important to note that in this period there is a notable event for university life in the country. In 1964 the University Community of the Faculty of Physics-Mathematics Science successfully demanded the government delivery of 104 blocks of land. This release was in exchange for the land where was working the Faculty in the center of Managua City. In these areas began to be built in 1969 and relates to current Recinto Universitario "Ruben Dario" of the National Autonomous University of Nicaragua, Managua campus.

In 1968 was approving the first curriculum transformation and, the new curriculum for the career of Civil Engineering.  This was developed based on the recommendations of the Second Round Table of Engineering Faculties of Central America. This transformation meant the updating of engineering education in line with the other Central American countries and the adoption of the semester system and the system of credits.

The engineering education in Nicaragua was wide with the creation of the Centroamerican University (UCA) in 1961 in Managua City. In Engineering Faculty of UCA is created the Civil Engineering, Electromechanical Engineering and Chemical Industrial Engineering careers.

The Engineering Faculty of  UCA rapidly expanding their field of training with the creation of eight specialties in the year 1980: Electrical Engineering, Electromechanical Engineering, Industrial Engineering, Industrial-Chemical Engineering, Civil Engineering, Civil-Management Engineering, Electronic Engineering and Computer Sciences.

In 1979 after the victory of the Sandinista Popular Revolution, begins in higher education a profound transformation of the entire system. The most significant elements of this transformation are as follows:
–	Creation of the National Council for Higher Education (CNES, by its initials in Spanish) with the purpose of regulating and controlling the academic, financial and administrative activities of higher education institutions in the country.
–	Separation of UNAN in two campus: UNAN-León and UNAN-Managua with the intention that both campuses would be autonomous.
–	Return to annual regime and blocks system removing the semester regime and the credit system.
–	Conformation of new curricula and programs of subjects from defining the areas of occupation of each of the specialties.
–	Relocation of careers and training courses to non-university centers involved.

In October 1982, President of CNES Dr. Ernesto Castillo Martinez contacted the Engineer Juan Sanchez Barquero, proposing to coordinate a committee comprising the Dean of Engineering at the UCA and the dean of the Faculty of Physical-Mathematics Science of the UNAN, to found an institution of higher education linking engineering and architecture education in Nicaragua to initiate activities in 1983.

In February 1983 by Decree 1234 of the Governing Board of National Reconstruction the National University of Engineering began serving on the teaching of engineering and architecture with a planning stage of education technology. According to Engineer Juan Sanchez Barquero, chancellor founder, a study was conducted during the first year of operation for the purpose of estimating the demand for professionals who needed the country based on investment projects to be executed at that time. This with the aim of not wasting the resources of the state and thus achieve a good investment in education*.

Creation of the unique Technological Institute of Nicaragua

The birth of the UNI was not easy, because Nicaragua was threatened with invasion by the United States of America due to the reforms introduced by the Sandinista Revolution. At the beginning there were limited resources, therefore the University Council decided to organize a foundation for development of the UNI involving government institutions to support transportation, materials and aids in the development of practical classes of students.

In addition, this foundation is proposed to get the cooperation of other countries, visiting embassies and explaining that it was of utmost priority for the country train engineers. The responses were impressive, because in a short time managed to gain the support of 28 embassies. Countries such as Germany, France, Cuba, United States, Peru, Venezuela, Soviet Union, Brazil, Mexico and Centroamerican universities offered a world of possibilities.

On the other hand, the ambassadors visited the infrastructure of the former Immaculate College destroyed by the earthquake of 1972, and observed the physical limitations of the site and found the will to work for human beings involved in the academic project. Then they signed cooperation agreements made support for the construction of laboratories and to train university teachers.

It was a time of searching, of overcoming and international solidarity, was a great event. We had up to 30 foreign teachers of high academic standing who left his family and resigned to earn excellent wages in their respective countries for the sole purpose of supporting the development of UNI, Engineer Julio Maltez said, the first general secretary of UNI.

It was amazing that during the American assault came a dean of the Massachusetts Institute of Technology (MIT) to join us for coffee breaks. Another memorable event was a dean of the Polytechnic University of Madrid do the same. Everything was magic, was a universal communication, without ideological flags, which made us overcome the challenge, Engineer Juan Sanchez Barquero said.

It was so obvious the international support that in 1985 the Pan American Health 
Environmental Engineering in the National University of Engineering.3

Academic challenges of the new millennium

In the initial period, UNI focused on teaching at the undergraduate. It developed some activity in research and extension around DINOT, also started some activity in the postgraduate program with the first two master's degrees in the INGAM. Highlights in this period the opening of training programs for teachers in the Project SAREC-KTH linked to the Faculty of Engineering Chemistry (FIQ) and the Faculty of Electrotechnology and Computer (FEC).

In the intermediate stage is placing priority on the activity of teaching and increase efforts to enhance research work. Efforts are made to define lines of research that would provide answers to the scientific-technical problems of Nicaragua, strengthened and expanded research programs in the faculties and INGAM, this became the Research and Teaching Environment Program, PIDMA, prioritizing research in various areas of Environment and were developed five technical cooperation projects with international support. In Biomass several projects were developed on an industrial scale. Was organized research groups, including renewable energy and conducted the first forums, conferences, to explain the scientific production.

At the stage of maturity driven are different expressions of the University Extension focusing on increasing the presence of the university in companies and municipalities. Was founded the Cleaner Production Center (CPML) with support from ONUDI. Creating programs to ensure the linkage as the Promoting the Municipal Development Program (FODMU), Care Enterprises Program (PAE) and Public Policy Program (PPP). In addition, agreements were signed with state institutions, municipal governments and enterprises. Were opened instances in some faculties to develop outreach university.

In scientific research efforts have been made to develop a culture of research in the university community. Mechanisms have been established for the purpose of involving greater number of teachers and students. These calls are designed to select projects that provide answers to the problems of Nicaragua and are funded through the budget allocated to UNI.

A highlight fact is the creation of the Research and Development Vicechancellorship (VRIyD) in 1998.4

External links

References

Buildings and structures in Managua
Universities in Nicaragua
Educational institutions established in 1983
1983 establishments in Nicaragua